Juan Sebastián Calero Hernández (born January 2, 1982) is a Colombian actor, recognized for his role as Richardo "El Richard" Castro in the series Gangs, War and Peace and Gangs, War and Peace II.  English-speaking viewers will best recognize him as Navegante, the violent top-ranking henchman in Seasons 1–3 of the Netflix original Narcos. He followed in the footsteps of his parents, Gerardo Calero and Vicky Hernández, both of whom are accomplished performance icons.

Productions

Television

Awards and nominations

TVyNovelas Awards

India Catalina Awards

References

Colombian actors
20th-century Colombian male actors
21st-century Colombian male actors
Colombian male television actors
Colombian male actors
Male actors from Bogotá
1982 births
Living people